The 2020 Petit Le Mans (formally known as the 2020 MOTUL Petit Le Mans for sponsorship reasons) was the 23rd running of the Petit Le Mans, and was held on October 17, 2020. It was the 9th race in the 2020 IMSA WeatherTech Sportscar Championship, and the 3rd race of the 2020 Michelin Endurance Cup, and was run at Road Atlanta in Braselton, Georgia. The race was won overall by the #10 Konica Minolta Cadillac Cadillac DPi-V.R after the #7 Acura Team Penske and #31 Whelen Engineering Racing entries made contact and spun out in the closing minutes of the race.

Qualifying 
Dane Cameron secured overall pole for the event.

Qualifying results 

Race

Results

References

Petit Le Mans
2020 WeatherTech SportsCar Championship season
2020 in sports in Georgia (U.S. state)
Petit Le Mans